Arthur Georg Nordenswan (27 January 1883 – 29 December 1970) was a Swedish Army officer and sport shooter who competed in the 1912 Summer Olympics.

Early life
Nordenswan was born on 27 January 1883 in Stockholm, Sweden, the son of major general Carl Otto Nordensvan and Ebba Maria (née Wallenius).

Career

Military career
Nordenswan was commissioned as an officer in 1902 and was assigned to Svea Life Guards (I 1) as a second lieutenant the same year. He became a lieutenant there in 1905. Nordenswan was promoted to captain in 1916 and served in Västernorrland Regiment (I 28) in 1921. He was promoted to major and served in Norrbotten Regiment (I 19) in 1926 and was promoted to lieutenant colonel in 1930 and served in Skaraborg Regiment (I 9) in 1932.

Nordenswan was commanding officer of the Swedish troops in the Territory of the Saar Basin in connection with the referendum in 1935. He was then promoted to colonel and served as commanding officer of Skaraborg Regiment from 1935 to 1942. During 1940 Nordenswan became colonel in the Finnish Army and commanded the Swedish Volunteer Corps' battlegroup at the Salla Front during the Winter War in Finland.

Sports career
In 1912 he won the silver medal as member of the Swedish team in the team 50 metre small-bore rifle competition. In the 50 metre rifle, prone event he finished 16th and in the 25 metre small-bore rifle competition he finished 28th.

Personal life
In 1909 he married Inez Kjerner (born 1883), the daughter of Doctor of Medicine Karl Kjerner and Emelie Magnell. They divorced and in 1918 Nordenswan married Ruth Persson (1893–1975), the daughter of farmer Peter Persson and Anna Eriksson.

Death
Nordenswan died on 29 December 1970 in Stockholm and was buried at Norra begravningsplatsen in Stockholm.

Awards and decorations
Nordenswan's awards:

Swedish
   Commander 1st Class of the Order of the Sword (15 November 1941)
  King Gustaf V's Olympic Medal
  Skaraborg Landsturm Association's gold medal (Skaraborgs landstormsförbunds guldmedalj)
  Skaraborg Shooting Federation's gold medal  (Skaraborgs skytteförbunds guldmedalj)
  Swedish Military Sports Association's gold medal (Sveriges militära idrottsförbunds guldmedalj)
  Gold Medal of the Society for the Promotion of Ski Sport and Open Air Life (Skid- och friluftsfrämjandets i Sveriges guldmedalj)

Foreign
  Second Class of the Order of the Cross of Liberty with swords
  Knight 3rd Class of the Order of Saint Stanislaus
  Cross of Merit of the Protection Corps of Finland (Finska skyddskårernas förtjänstkors)
  Finnish War Memorial Medal

References

External links
profile

1883 births
1970 deaths
Swedish Army colonels
Swedish male sport shooters
ISSF rifle shooters
Olympic shooters of Sweden
Shooters at the 1912 Summer Olympics
Olympic silver medalists for Sweden
Olympic medalists in shooting
Medalists at the 1912 Summer Olympics
Military personnel from Stockholm
Volunteers in the Winter War
Commanders First Class of the Order of the Sword
Burials at Norra begravningsplatsen